Bibey is a surname. Notable people with the surname include:

Alan Bibey (born 1964), American mandolinist, singer-songwriter, and band leader
Ricky Bibey (born 1981), British rugby league footballer

See also
Bybee (surname)